Raymond Tait (Ray) Affleck (20 November 1922 – 16 March 1989) was a Canadian architect. He was born on 20 November 1922 in Penticton, British Columbia. He died in Montreal on 16 March 1989. One of the founders of Montreal-based architectural firm Arcop, he also taught at leading universities in Canada and the United States.

Academic career
Raymond Affleck attended McGill University, receiving a Bachelor of Architecture degree in 1947, and in 1948 undertook postgraduate studies at the Federal Technical Institute in Zurich. He later taught at prominent universities including Harvard University, University of Manitoba, University of Toronto and Technical University of Nova Scotia. He was a Fellow in the Royal Architectural Institute of Canada (1965) and an Academician in the Royal Academy of Arts (1967).

Business career
He opened the R.T. Affleck independent architectural practice in 1952, and in 1955 participated in the creation of an architecture firm together with Guy Desbarats, Dimitri Dimakopoulos, Fred Lebensold and Hazen Sise. This firm changed its name to Arcop Associates, Architects and Planners in 1970.

Major projects
Projects undertaken by Arcop ranged from Queen Elizabeth Theatre, Vancouver (1955) to St John's (Newfoundland) Arts and Cultural Centre (1967). These projects helped to establish Affleck as an influential architect. Between 1964 and 1968 Affleck was mainly engaged on the Place Bonaventure complex in central Montreal, which has been described as "a somewhat forbidding example of Brutalism". Other prominent projects included Place Ville Marie (1956-1965)  and Maison Alcan (1983) in Montreal.

Other projects
 Place des Arts (Salle Wilfrid-Pelletier), Montreal (1963)
 University Centre, McGill University, Montreal (1965)
 Stephen Leacock Building, McGill University, Montreal (1965)
 Life Sciences Centre, Dalhousie University, Halifax (Nova Scotia) (1971)
 Mughal Sheraton Hotel, Agra (1978)
 Place Air Canada, Montreal (1983)
 Post Office, Mont-Royal
 Number One Wood Avenue, Montreal

Architectural thinking
In projects such as Place Bonaventure, Affleck sought to include indoor pedestrian routes and atria, design features suited to a cold climate. The aim was an integrated architectural plan encompassing buildings, streets and main highways.

At Maison Alcan, a restored historic hotel and greystone houses on Sherbrooke Street are joined to the modern glass and aluminum-clad structure behind by means of a glazed atrium. Market Square (Saint John, 1983) is another important conservation and infill project that demonstrates the application of Affleck's urban theories.

Personal life
Affleck married Betty Ann Henley in 1950. They had five children, including animator Neil Affleck and architect Gavin Affleck.

Awards
 Massey Medal - 1961, 1964, 1967, 1970
 Canadian Centennial Medal - 1967
 Award of excellence, Canadian Architectural Yearbook, 1968
 Aga Khan Award for Islamic Architectural Design, 1980
 Prix d'excellence, Ordre des architectes du Québec, 1984
 Royal Architectural Institute of Canada (RAIC) Gold Medal (posthumously) - 1989

References

External links 
 Finding aid for the Ray Affleck fonds, Canadian Centre for Architecture

1922 births
1989 deaths
Modernist architecture in Canada
People from Penticton
Canadian company founders
20th-century Canadian architects
Architects from Montreal
McGill School of Architecture alumni
Canadian expatriates in the United States